The president of the Chamber of Most Worthy Peers was the presiding officer of the upper house of the Cortes Gerais, the legislature of the Kingdom of Portugal during most of the constitutional monarchy period. The upper house was named the Chamber of Senators 1838 – 1842.

Sources 

Portugal